Andy Sneap (born 18 July 1969) is an English guitarist, record producer and composer with over 100 albums to his name, most of which have been produced at his Backstage Recording studios in rural Derbyshire. Some of the most critically acclaimed production work on albums include Deliverance by Opeth and Disarm the Descent by Killswitch Engage; for which he earned a Swedish Grammis and a US Grammy nomination, respectively. As a performer, he first built his reputation as one of the guitarists in the British thrash metal band Sabbat, and played with them up until their disbanding. He is currently one of the co-guitarists of the British heavy metal band Hell. In 2018 he joined Judas Priest as a touring guitarist, following long-time lead guitarist Glenn Tipton's diagnosis of Parkinson's disease which conflicts with his touring abilities.

He is one of the most active music producers in the heavy metal music genre and has worked with bands such as Judas Priest, Accept, Blaze Bayley, Dream Theater, Saxon, Opeth, Amon Amarth, Arch Enemy, Exodus, Megadeth, Kataklysm, Kreator, Nevermore, Testament, Carcass, Fear Factory, Overkill and DevilDriver. Of his production career, Sneap holds the distinction of having been credited as a producer, mixer or engineer on all six of Testament's albums since The Gathering (1999) – including the collection of re-recorded material First Strike Still Deadly (2001) – as well as all nine of Exodus' releases since the live album Another Lesson in Violence (1997). He also mixed Megadeth's show from the DVD The Big Four: Live from Sofia, Bulgaria, also featuring Metallica, Slayer and Anthrax.

Biography 
Andy Sneap was born on 18 July 1969 in Belper, Derbyshire. He got his first guitar and amplifier from his parents at age 12 as a Christmas present. He started learning guitar with founding Hell member Dave Halliday, who had a huge effect on Andy and left him all the rights to all his songs and equipment in his will following his death. Sneap joined a British heavy metal band called Hydra as the second guitarist when he was 15 years old. But two weeks later, the original guitarist and drummer quit, Simon Negus joined them, and the band's name changed to Sabbat.

After disbanding Hydra and forming a new band, they chose Sabbat as the new name, which came from a book on witchcraft. After one year of rehearsing, they recorded a four-track demo tape, Fragments of a Faith Forgotten. Sneap distributed the demo tape to many record companies, but on listening, Berlin-based recording company Noise Records showed interest and asked for more material. In 1987, Noise Records offered the band a recording contract, but the contract could not be signed until Sneap turned 18 years old in July 1987. So they made a plan to start recording the band's first full studio album, History of a Time to Come. Andy wrote all the music while Martin Walkyier was responsible for the lyrics. Sabbat released the album on 20 April 1988 via Noise Records, which received positive attention from journalists and fans alike.

In January 1989 Sneap and the other band members entered Sky Trak Studio in Berlin to start recording their second album, Dreamweaver, which was a concept album based on the 1983 book by Brian Bates – The Way of Wyrd: Tales of an Anglo-Saxon Sorcerer. Andy wrote almost all of the music except three songs, which Simon Jones also wrote with Andy. The album has come to be regarded as a classic of the thrash metal genre, which reflects Andy's predilection at that time for increasingly lengthy and progressively technical thrash metal songs.

Discography

As a band member

Selected production

References

External links

Living people
British record producers
English heavy metal guitarists
1969 births